Hassan Al-Khadrawi (born 2 March 1990) is a Saudi Arabian handball player for Mudhar and the Saudi Arabian national team.

He participated at the 2017 World Men's Handball Championship.

References

1990 births
Living people
Saudi Arabian male handball players
21st-century Saudi Arabian people